This is a list of all of the notable historic sites in the ceremonial county of Lincolnshire, England.

This list is incomplete. Please feel free to expand it.

Stone Age (Neolithic)

Bronze Age

Iron Age

Roman Britain - 43 to 410

Early Middle Ages - 410 to 1066

Later Middle Ages - 1066 to 1485

Early Modern - 1485 to 1800

Modern - 1800 to present

See also

 Lincolnshire
 History of Lincolnshire
 Kingdom of Lindsey
 Lindum Colonia
  List of castles in England

 
Historic places